Kuopio Market Hall is an Art Nouveau-style market hall on Kuopio Market Square in the Multimäki district in Kuopio, Finland. The market hall has a sales point for 30 companies. It is open all year round six days a week.

The building was designed by Johan Victor Strömberg and the market hall began operations in August 1902. The hall was expanded in 1914 with a meat inspection center designed by Arne Sirelius, which now functions as a fish market. Later, the appearance of the hall has been improved and interior renovations have been made. The demolition of the market hall was last seriously discussed in the 1960s. However, it was decided to renovate the market hall in the early 1970s. The current coloring of the building dates from this period.

The Market Hall project had been planned since the 1870s. The purity requirements for food sales had risen, and thus the need to build a permanent Point of Sale on the market also came to Kuopio. At the same time, the construction of a bazaar building was also planned for the square, but it was never carried out; also the market hall planned for the harbor square at the same time was never realized either.

See also 
 Kauppakatu
 Oulu Market Hall
 Tampere Market Hall
 Turku Market Hall

Sources

References

External links 

Kuopio Market Hall – Official Site

Buildings and structures in Kuopio
Market_halls
Commercial_buildings_completed_in_1902
Buildings_and_structures_completed_in_1902